Tiger Love may refer to:
Tiger Love (1924 film), an American drama silent film
Tiger Love (1977 film), a Hong Kong martial arts film
 Tiger Love (album), by Ray Simpson (1978)
Tiger Love (musical group), an Israeli synth pop duo